HTML+TIME (Timed Interactive Multimedia Extensions) was the name of a W3C submission from Microsoft, Compaq/DEC and Macromedia that proposed an integration of SMIL semantics with HTML and CSS. The specifics of the integration were modified considerably by W3C working groups, and eventually emerged as the W3C Note XHTML+SMIL. The submission also proposed new animation and timing features that were adopted (with revisions) in SMIL 2.0.

Microsoft modified their implementation in IE 5.5 to (mostly) match the W3C Note, but continues to use the HTML+TIME moniker to refer to the associated feature set.

See also
SMIL
XHTML+SMIL

External links
 Original HTML+TIME submission
 XHTML+SMIL W3C Note
 Introduction to HTML+TIME
 HTML+TIME Overviews and Tutorials
 HTML+TIME demos and some how-to's

Markup languages